Andriani Marshanda or better known as Marshanda (born 10 August 1989) is an Indonesian actress, singer and songwriter of Minangkabau descent.

Biography
Marshanda is the eldest of three children, born to parents Riyanti Sofyan and Irwan Yusuf on 10 August 1989 in Jakarta, Indonesia, under the astrological sign Leo. She has a younger brother, Aldrian (Didi) and a younger sister, Allysa (Lisya). She lived in Semarang, Central Java when she was three years old, on the street adjacent to the campus of Pleburan V Undip. She remained there for two years.

Personal life
Chacha (or Marshanda) was associated with actor Baim Wong, but they eventually broke up. Chacha then began a relationship with television host and MTV Indonesia VJ, Ben Kasyafani. After dating for three years, Chacha and Ben Kasyafani officially became husband and wife when they were married on Saturday, 2 April 2011. Their wedding was held in the Bidakara Hotel in Pancoran, Jakarta. The event was arranged in the customs of Minangkabau, which is Chacha's ethnic background.

On 22 January 2013 Chacha gave birth to a daughter, Sienna Ameerah Kasyafani. During the divorce, both parents sought custody of the daughter, but in the first stage of the court decision, Ben Kasyafani won custody of the child.

On 13 June 2015 Marshanda graduated from Universitas Pelita Harapan.

Discography

Studio album
 Bidadari (Angel) (2000)
 Marshanda (2005)
 Taubat (Reptile) (2014)

Compilation album
 Allah Yang Kucintai (2002)
 Best of Female Idol (2004)
 Broken Heart (2004)
 Kisah Kasih di Sekolah (The Love Story in School) (2004)
 Now and Forever (2004)
 Dua Belas Lagu Islami Terbaik (Twelve Best Islamic Songs) (2004)

Single

Filmography

Film

Television

References

External links
  Marshanda idol sites
  Marshanda in Yahoo Groups
  Marshanda in Yahoo Groups 2
  Marshanda in Gaul Web Forum
  The case of the Marshanda with Multivision
  Marshanda in Liputan 6 SCTV
  News about Marshanda in SeputarBerita.com

1989 births
Indonesian television actresses
21st-century Indonesian women singers
Indonesian rhythm and blues singers
Indonesian pop singers
Living people
Minangkabau people
Actresses from Jakarta